Drilini is a tribe of beetles known commonly as the false firefly beetles, in the family Elateridae.

Systematics
In 2011, this lineage, formerly treated as a family, was transferred to the family Elateridae as the tribe Drilini. Two former genera, Pseudeuanoma and Euanoma, were moved to the click beetle subfamily Omalisinae.

A 2019 study presented the first densely sampled molecular phylogeny of Drilini based on nuclear and mitochondrial markers, recovering 5 major clades well supported by morphology along with several new genera and species.

References 

Elateridae
Beetle tribes